Hume-Fogg Academic Magnet High School is a public magnet high school serving grades 9–12 and located in downtown Nashville, Tennessee, United States.

History
Hume School, serving the first through 12th grades, opened in 1855 on Eighth Avenue (Spruce Street) just north of Broad and was the first public school in Nashville.

In 1875 Fogg High School was built adjacent to Hume School at the corner of Broad and Eighth and absorbed its high school students. Around 1910 both schools were razed and replaced by Hume-Fogg High School, a Gothic Revival building, which opened in 1912. The building consists of five floors including a basement, which has several tunnels leading to various locations in downtown Nashville. However, they are currently boarded off and inaccessible. In 1942 Hume-Fogg was recast as a technical and vocational school.

It continued in this capacity until the 1982 court-supervised desegregation of Nashville's public school system, decades after the US Supreme Court ruled that segregation of public schools was unconstitutional. In that year Hume-Fogg was redeveloped as an academic magnet school for Nashville's gifted and talented secondary students. In the 2004–2005 school year Hume-Fogg celebrated its sesquicentennial anniversary.

Academics
Hume-Fogg is an academic magnet school and offers 31 advanced-placement (AP) courses. All academic courses—with the exception of PE and art courses—are taught at the honors or AP level.

Nearly 100 percent of graduates each year go on to four-year colleges, many earning prestigious academic scholarships in the process. Each year the Hume-Fogg senior class is granted over ten million dollars in cumulative scholarship and grant money from various universities across the United States.

In 2012, Hume-Fogg had twelve National Merit Semifinalists and four National Achievement Semifinalists, as well as four semifinalists in the Intel Science Talent Search Competition and three semifinalists in the Siemens Competition in Math, Science, and Technology.

In the 2006–2007 academic year Hume-Fogg received the National Siemens Award for one of the best science- and math-based academic programs in the country. In addition, Newsweek and U.S. News & World Report have consistently ranked Hume-Fogg among the top public high schools in America:

(Parentheses have school's rank within Tennessee)

Arts at Hume-Fogg
Hume-Fogg's Arts Department consists of Fine Arts, Band, Orchestra, Choir, and Theater programs.

Every year, Hume-Fogg's theater department collaborates with the choral and orchestral programs on the production of a fall musical. Recent productions include Hairspray, West Side Story, Les Misérables, and Beauty and the Beast.

The Band program consists of Beginning Band, Concert Band, Wind Ensemble, and two Jazz Bands, and jazz combos. The jazz band has competed in the Essentially Ellington High School Jazz Band Competition and Festival in New York City on several occasions. The Orchestra program consists of a String ensemble, which also serves as part of the Pit Orchestra in the fall musicals. The Hume-Fogg String Orchestra has collaborated with the string ensembles of Martin Luther King Magnet at Pearl High School at the MTSBOA Concert Festivals. The Choral program consists of a Mixed Chorus and a Show Choir. Several students perform in musical groups outside of school such as the Curb Youth Symphony, Music City Youth Orchestra, and the Blair Chorus programs.

Athletics
Hume-Fogg has the highest percentage of students in sports in Davidson County. In 1964, it was the first public high school in Nashville to desegregate its sports teams.

Varsity sports:
 Boys'/girls' basketball
 Boys' lacrosse
 Boys'/girls' tennis
 Baseball
 Bowling
 Boys'/girls' golf
 Cross country
 Boys'/girls' track
 Ice hockey
 Boys'/girls' soccer
 Wrestling
 Softball
 Volleyball
 Co-op football with Hillwood
Club sports (sports that require student organization and self-funding):
 Boys'/girls' swimming
 Ultimate
 Ping pong
 Shooting

School mascot
The current school mascot, which was voted on by the student body in 2008, is Knightro, the Blue Knight. The school colors are blue and white.

Rivals
Hume-Fogg's sports and academic rival is Martin Luther King Magnet at Pearl High School, located less than two miles from the school.

Notable alumni

Fyütch, Grammy-nominated music artist and educator
Ruby Amanfu, Grammy-nominated singer/songwriter
Starlito (or All $tar Cashville Prince), rapper
Calpernia Addams, transgender entertainer, activist, and writer
 Johnny Beazley, professional baseball pitcher
 Phil Harris, comedian, actor, and singer
 Delbert Mann, Academy Award-winning director
 Bettie Page, pinup queen and Playboy Playmate; graduated second in the class of 1940
 Randall Jarrell, poet; with a historical marker at the school
 Ricardo Patton, college basketball coach
 Alex Renfroe, professional basketball player 
 Dinah Shore, singer/actress
 Matt Friction, vocalist and guitarist for The Pink Spiders
Street Symphony, Grammy-winning producer, music executive 
David Harrison Macon (or Uncle Dave Macon), Old time banjo player

Notes

External links

Hume-Fogg's website

Public high schools in Tennessee
Schools in Nashville, Tennessee
School buildings on the National Register of Historic Places in Tennessee
William B. Ittner buildings
Tudor Revival architecture in Tennessee
Magnet schools in Tennessee
National Register of Historic Places in Nashville, Tennessee